A Christmas decoration is any of several types of ornamentation used at Christmastide and the greater holiday season. The traditional colors of Christmas are pine green (evergreen), snow white, and heart red. Gold and silver are also very common, as are other metallic colours.  Typical images on Christmas decorations include Baby Jesus, Father Christmas, Santa Claus, and the star of Bethlehem.

In many countries, such as Sweden, people start to set up their Advent and Christmas decorations on the first day of Advent. Liturgically, this is done in some parishes through a Hanging of the Greens ceremony. In the Western Christian world, the two traditional days when Christmas decorations are removed are Twelfth Night and if they are not taken down on that day, Candlemas, the latter of which ends the Christmas-Epiphany season in some denominations. Taking down Christmas decorations before Twelfth Night, as well as leaving the decorations up beyond Candlemas, is historically considered to be inauspicious.

History
Christmas decorations are as old as Christmas itself. They are mentioned in ancient descriptions of the Roman feast Saturnalia, which was believed to have originated in the 5th century BC.

The tradition of a decorated tree is old since the Celts already decorated a tree, the symbol of life at the time of the winter solstice. The Scandinavians did the same for the Yule festival, which was held around the same date as Christmas.

Tertullian complained to the 2nd century that Christians in North Africa decorated their homes with greenery, a pagan symbol.

Tree 

The Christmas tree was first used by German Lutherans in the 16th century, with records indicating that a Christmas tree was placed in the Cathedral of Strassburg in 1539, under the leadership of the Protestant Reformer, Martin Bucer. In the United States, these "German Lutherans brought the decorated Christmas tree with them; the Moravians put lighted candles on those trees." When decorating the Christmas tree, many individuals place a star at the top of the tree symbolizing the Star of Bethlehem, a fact recorded by The School Journal in 1897. Professor David Albert Jones of Oxford University writes that in the 19th century, it became popular for people to also use an angel to top the Christmas tree in order to symbolize the angels mentioned in the accounts of the Nativity of Jesus. In discussions of folklore, some claim that the Christmas tree is a Christianization of pagan tradition and ritual surrounding the winter solstice, which included the use of evergreen boughs, and an adaptation of pagan tree worship; according to eighth-century biographer Æddi Stephanus, Saint Boniface (634–709), who was a missionary in Germany, took an axe to an oak tree dedicated to Thor and pointed out a fir tree, which he stated was a more fitting object of reverence because it pointed to heaven and it had a triangular shape, which he said was symbolic of the Trinity. However, the English-language phrase "Christmas tree" is first recorded in 1835 and represents an importation from the German language. From Germany the custom was introduced to England, first via Queen Charlotte, wife of George III, and then more successfully by Prince Albert during the early reign of Queen Victoria. The influential 1840s image of the Queen's decorated evergreen was republished in the U.S, and as the first widely circulated picture of a decorated Christmas tree in America, the custom there spread. Christmas trees may be decorated with lights and ornaments.

Types of decorations

Glass ornaments
Figural glass Christmas ornaments originated in the small town of Lauscha, Germany in the latter half of the 19th century. The town had long produced fine glassware. The production of Christmas ornaments became a family affair for many people. Some families invested 16 hours a day in production. For some, it was their sole source of income.

Sometimes competitions were held. Prizes were awarded to the family producing the finest examples. Santa Clauses, angels, birds, animals, and other traditional Yuletide subjects were favorites.

F.W. Woolworth discovered these glass ornaments on a toy and doll buying trip to Sonnenburg, Germany in the 1890s. He sold them in his "five and ten cent" stores in America. The ornaments were said to have contributed to Woolworth's great business success.

For the American market, figures were blown depicting comic book characters as well as patriotic subjects such as Uncle Sams, eagles, and flags. Glassblowers have held on to the old molds. Glass ornaments are still created from these old molds.

Method
A clear glass tube is heated over an open flame. It is then inserted into a mold. The glassblower then blows into the end of the tube. The glass expands to fill the mold. The glass takes on the shape of the mold. It is cooled. A silver nitrate solution is swirled about inside the ornament. This gives the ornament a silver glow. The outside of the ornament is painted or decorated with metal trims, paper clippings, etc.

Cotton batting
Cotton batting Christmas ornaments were popular during the years of the German Christmas toy and decoration boom at the turn of the century. They were exported in large numbers to the United States. These decorations suggested puffs of snow. Fruits and vegetables were popular subjects and often had a realistic appearance. African American and patriotic characters were fashioned for the American market. Some ornaments were used to hide boxes of candy.

Assembling these decorations was a cottage industry. Cotton batting was wound around a wire frame resembling a human or animal. A face was either painted on or a lithograph cut-out was affixed to the batting. Figures were given crepe paper costumes. Some were touched with glue and sprinkled with flakes of mica for a glittering appearance.

Dresden 
Dresdens are three-dimensional ornaments. They are made of paper, card, or cardboard. Dresdens were produced mostly in Dresden and Leipzig, Germany, from the 1860s to WWI. They were originally priced between 1 and 60 cents. Subjects included animals and birds, suns and moons, humans, carriages and ships, etc. Some Dresdens were flat, allowing the buyer to collect them in scrapbooks.

Positive and negative molds were set into a press. A moistened sheet of card was put into the press. The images were pressed. When they had dried, they were sent to cottage workers for the finishing touches. This involved separating the form-halves from the card, trimming ragged edges, and gluing the two halves together. The form was then gilded, silvered, or hand-painted. Sometimes a small gift or sweet was put into the form. Forms were usually no larger than five inches.

Plants 
 Popular Christmas plants include holly, mistletoe, ivy and Christmas trees. The interior of a home may be decorated with these plants, along with garlands and evergreen foliage.  These often come with small ornaments tied to the delicate branches, and sometimes with a small light set.

Wreaths are made from real or artificial conifer branches, or sometimes other broadleaf evergreens or holly.  Several types of evergreen or even deciduous branches may be used in the same wreath, along with pinecones and sprays of berries, and Christmas ornaments including jingle bells.  A bow is usually used at the top or bottom, and an electric or unlit candle may be placed in the middle.  Christmas lights are often used, and they may be hung from door or windows, and sometimes walls, lampposts and light fixtures, or even statuary.

Since the nineteenth century, the poinsettia, a native plant from Mexico, has been associated with Christmas

Different places also have different traditions and superstitions about when and how to remove Christmas decorations.  For example, in some parts of England, people believed that if Christmas greenery were thrown away instead of being burned, a ghost would appear, but in other parts, they believed that if the greenery were burned instead of being thrown away, a family member would die.

Outdoors 

In North and South America, Australia, and Europe, it is traditional to decorate the outside of houses with lights and sometimes with illuminated sleighs, snowmen, and other Christmas figures. Municipalities often sponsor decorations as well. Christmas banners may be hung from street lights and Christmas trees placed in the town square.

Others 
In the Western world, rolls of brightly colored paper with secular or religious Christmas/winter/Hanukkah motifs are manufactured for the purpose of giftwrapping presents. The display of Christmas villages has also become a tradition in many homes during this season. Other traditional decorations include bells, reindeer, candles, candy canes, garland, stockings, wreaths, snow globes, and angels. Snow sheets are made specifically for simulating snow under a tree or village.

In many countries a representation of the Nativity scene is very popular, and people are encouraged to compete and create the most original or realistic ones. Within some families, the pieces used to make the representation are considered a valuable family heirloom.  Some churches also perform a live Nativity with volunteers and even live animals.

One of the most popular items of Christmas decorations are stockings. According to legend, Saint Nicolas would creep in through the chimney and slip gold into stockings hanging by the fireplace. Various forms of stockings are available; from simple velvet ones, to sock-shaped bags to animated ones.

Season 

Christmas decorations are typically put up in late November or early December, usually to coincide with the start of Advent. In the UK, Christmas lights on the high street are generally switched on in November.  In the US, the traditional start of the holiday season is Thanksgiving. Major retailers put their seasonal decorations out for sale after back to school sales, while smaller niche Christmas Stores sell Christmas decorations year round.

In some places Christmas decorations are traditionally taken down on Twelfth Night, the evening of January 5 or January 6. The difference in this date is due to the fact that some count Christmas Day as the first day of Christmas, whereas for others Christmas Day is a feast day in its own right, and the first full day of the Christmas Season is December 26. In Hispanic and other cultures, this is more like Christmas Eve, as the Three Wise Men bring gifts that night, and therefore decorations are left up longer.  The same is true in Eastern Churches which often observe Christmas according to the Julian Calendar, thus making it fall 13 days later.

In England, it was customary to burn the decorations in the hearth, however this tradition has fallen out of favour as reusable and imperishable decorations made of plastics, wood, glass and metal became more popular. If a Yule log has been kept alight since Christmas Day, it is put out and the ashes kept to include in the fire on the following Christmas Day. A superstition exists which suggests that if decorations are kept up after Twelfth Night, they must be kept up until the following Twelfth Night, but also that if the decorations for the current Christmas are taken down before the New Year begins, bad luck shall befall the house for a whole year.

In the United States, many stores immediately remove decorations the day after Christmas, as some think of the holiday season as being over once Christmas has passed.  A vast majority of Americans who put up home decorations keep them out and lit until at least New Year's Day, and inside decorations can often be seen in windows for several weeks afterward.

References